The American Music Award for Favorite Male Artist – Country has been awarded since 1974. Years reflect the year in which the awards were presented, for works released in the previous year (until 2003 onward when awards were handed out on November of the same year). The all-time winner in this category is Garth Brooks with 8 wins.

Winners and nominees

1970s

1980s

1990s

2000s

2010s

2020s

Category facts

Multiple wins

 8 wins
 Garth Brooks

 6 wins
 Tim McGraw

 5 wins
 Luke Bryan
 Kenny Rogers

 4 wins
 Willie Nelson

 3 wins
 Charley Pride
 Randy Travis
 Kane Brown

 2 wins
 Toby Keith
 Brad Paisley
 Blake Shelton
 George Strait
 Keith Urban

Multiple nominations

 12 nominations
 George Strait

 10 nominations
 Garth Brooks
 Alan Jackson

 9 nominations
 Tim McGraw

 7 nominations
 Jason Aldean
 Luke Bryan
 Toby Keith
 Kenny Rogers

 6 nominations
 Willie Nelson
 Charley Pride
 Hank Williams Jr.

 5 nominations
 Kenny Chesney
 Conway Twitty

 4 nominations
 Luke Combs
 Brad Paisley
 Thomas Rhett
 Blake Shelton

 3 nominations
 Clint Black
 Vince Gill
 Merle Haggard
 Ronnie Milsap
 Randy Travis
 Keith Urban
 Morgan Wallen

 2 nominations
 Sam Hunt
 Waylon Jennings
 Charlie Rich
 Chris Stapleton

References

American Music Awards
Country music awards
Awards established in 1974
1974 establishments in the United States